The Individual normal hill/10 km competition at the FIS Nordic World Ski Championships 2019 was held on 28 February 2019.

Results

Ski jumping
The ski jumping part was held at 11:00.

Cross-country skiing
The cross-country skiing part was held at 15:15.

References

Individual normal hill/10 km